Tulsi Kumar Dua popularly known as Tulsi Kumar is an Indian playback singer, radio jockey, musician, and actress in the Bollywood industry. She was born to businessman Gulshan Kumar who was the owner of T Series and Great Singer and his wife Sudesh Kumari. She is the sister of film producer Bhushan Kumar & actress Khushali Kumar. She also owns Kids Hut, a YouTube channel owned by record label T-Series, featuring children's content including nursery rhymes and stories.

In 2009, her debut album, Love ho Jaaye, was released. Along with the album, Kumar made a music video for the title track. She also sang "Mujhe Teri" from the movie Paathshaala and "Tum Jo Aaye" from Once Upon a Time in Mumbaai.

She sang the song "Mainu Ishq Da Lagya Rog" in 2015, through which her sister Khushali made her screen debut. It is a recreated version of the original song from the movie Dil Hai Ke Manta Nahin.

Kumar sang "Soch Na Sake", "Sanam Re", "Nachange Sari Raat", "Ishq Di Latt", "Salamat", "Dekh Lena", "Wajah Tum Ho", "Dil Ke Pass", and "Dil Mein Chupa Lunga" in 2016 she also duoed with Guru Randhawa in Enni Soni in 2019.

In 2020, during the COVID-19 lockdown, she released several songs where she collaborated with Darshan Raval on Tere Naal, Millind Gaba on Naam. Her blockbuster single "Tanhaai" was released on T-Series official YouTube channel and has gained over 11 crore views on YouTube.

In 2021, Kumar released the single "Pehle Pyaar Ka Pehla Gham" sung along with Jubin Nautiyal. The music video features Parth Samthaan and her sister Khushali. In February 2021, she released a new song "Main Jis Din Bhula Doon" along with Nautiyal which featured Himansh Kohli and Sneha Namanandi.

She was seen hosting season 2 of Indie Hai Hum in February 2021.

Later on, she released her blockbuster romantic hit ''Is Qadar'' sung along with Darshan Raval and the music video features them both.

On 30 June 2021, Kumar and Nautiyal's Amazon Prime Mixtape season 3 was out. The songs in the mixtape were Tera Chehra and Jaan Meri

On 5 October 2021, Darshan Raval and Tulsi Kumar's #ShaadiWalaSong Tera Naam was released. This is the third Collaboration of this duo.
The song hit 9 million+ views and was trending on #2 on YouTube Global Charts within 24 hours of release. Fans are giving immense love to this song.

Personal life
Kumar was born as Tulsi Kumar Dua in a Punjabi Hindu family to businessman and founder of T-Series Gulshan Kumar and his wife Sudesh Kumari. Divya Khosla Kumar is Tulsi's sister-in-law.

In 2015, she married businessperson Hitesh Ralhan in Nepal. The couple has a son, born in 2017.

Accolades
Kumar has won several accolades including the International Indian Film Academy award for Best Female Playback Singer in 2017 for the song "Soch Na Sake", Mirchi Music Award – Listener's Choice Song of the Year in 2017 for "Soch Na Sake" from the film Airlift, and Mirchi Music Awards – Best Album in 2020 for the soundtrack to Kabir Singh. She has also been nominated for the IIFA Best Female Playback Singer in 2010 and 2019.

Discography

Films

Albums / Singles

Awards

References

External links
 

Bollywood playback singers
Indian women playback singers
Living people
Punjabi people
21st-century Indian women singers
21st-century Indian singers
Women musicians from Delhi
Singers from Delhi
International Indian Film Academy Awards winners
1986 births